Shuttleworth is the surname of a family that appears to have originated in either Lancashire or Yorkshire no later than the 14th century.

It is claimed that the name was first found in Lancashire, at Shuttleworth, now a hamlet at the northeastern extremity of the Metropolitan Borough of Bury, in Greater Manchester. The place name derives from the Old English words "scyttels" + "worth" and literally means "gated enclosure." Early spellings of the hamlet included Suttelsworth in 1227 and Shuttelesworthe in 1296.

The name may refer to:

 A. R. B. Shuttleworth, British politician
 Anna Shuttleworth, British cellist
 Archie Shuttleworth, character from Coronation Street played by Roy Hudd
 Bobby Shuttleworth, American goalkeeper
 Charles Shuttleworth, Canadian politician
 Daryl Shuttleworth, Canadian actor
 Edythe Shuttleworth (1907–1983), Canadian mezzo-soprano
 Sir James Kay-Shuttleworth, 1st Baronet, English politician
 Jane and John Shuttleworth, co-founders of Mother Earth News magazine
 John Shuttleworth (industrialist), English industrialist
 John Shuttleworth (character), created by English comic actor Graham Fellows
 Ken Shuttleworth (architect), English architect
 Ken Shuttleworth (cricketer), English cricketer
 Mark Shuttleworth, South African entrepreneur
 Obadiah Shuttleworth, English composer
 Rachel Kay-Shuttleworth (1886-1967), English textile collector
 Richard Shuttleworth, see disambiguation
 Robert James Shuttleworth, (1810–1874) Swiss-British malacologist
 Timothy Shuttleworth (born 1997), British swimmer
 Ughtred Kay-Shuttleworth, 1st Baron Shuttleworth, British politician

See also
 Shuttlesworth

References

English-language surnames
English toponymic surnames